Mark Davis (born 12 August 1972) is an English professional snooker player from St Leonards in Sussex. He became professional in 1991, and for many years was considered something of a journeyman; however, he vastly improved his game in the late 2000s, and as a result in 2012 made his debut in the top 16. The highlights of his career so far have been winning the Benson & Hedges Championship in 2002 (earning him an appearance at the Masters), and the six-red snooker world championships three times (in 2009, 2012 and 2013). Davis reached his first ranking event final in 2018, losing to Stuart Bingham in the final of the English Open. Prior to this he was widely considered to be the best player never to have reached a ranking final.

Career 
Davis made his debut in the main draw of the World Championship in 1994, losing in the first round to Terry Griffiths. In the following year he won his first match at the Crucible, beating Ken Doherty in the first round before being knocked out by Peter Ebdon in the second. Davis came close to losing his Main Tour status in the late 1990s, but recovered in the early 2000s to return to the top 48. Reaching the quarter-finals of the 2001 Regal Scottish tournament, his second career quarter-final, was the main catalyst for this. His success in reaching the 2008 World Championship came after two poor seasons, leaving him at No. 58 in the rankings. He opened the 2008/2009 season strongly by qualifying for the Northern Ireland Trophy and defeating local hope Joe Swail 5–4 in the first round, before beating Ding Junhui 5–4 in the last 32 in one of the best wins of his career. He was beaten 5–2 in the last 16 by Ali Carter. He followed this up by also qualifying for the Bahrain and UK Championships, though in the latter he was forced to pull out early in his last-32 match against Joe Perry, due to a stomach upset. He exceeded his 2007/2008 ranking points total after only five of the eight events of the 2008/2009 season. Davis won the Six-Red World Championship in 2009. In 2010, he reached the second round of the World Championship for the first time in 15 years by defeating sixth seed Ryan Day.

Davis has compiled over 200 competitive centuries in his career up to October 2016, putting him 27th in the top of the players reaching a century of centuries in a career.

He attained his career-best tournament break of 143 in the China Open on 29 March 2010, the 93rd century of his career, in a wild-card round match against Tian Pengfei. After an excellent 2009/2010 season, he reached the top 32 of the players and also claimed his highest rank, number 26.

He also qualified for the 2010 Shanghai Masters event where he reached the last-eight beating Marco Fu and Stephen Maguire on the way before surrendering a 4–1 lead against Jamie Burnett and going out 5–4. However, his strong performances continued and took him to a career-high ranking of 18.

2011/2012 season
Davis qualified for all but two of the ranking events in the 2011–12 season. He could only advance beyond the first round in the Australian Goldfields Open, where he lost 3–5 to Mark Selby in the last 16. Davis played in all 12 of the minor-ranking Players Tour Championship events during the season, reaching the final of Event 4, where he lost to Selby 0–4. This result was a large contributory factor to Davis finishing 16th on the PTC Order of Merit, inside the top 24 who made the Finals. At the Finals he beat Tom Ford, before losing to Stephen Maguire in the last 16. Davis' season came to an end when he suffered a heavy 2–10 loss, while feeling unwell, in the World Championship to Ali Carter. He finished the season ranked world number 19, with the elite top 16 places still eluding him.

2012/2013 season
Davis started the 2012–13 season very successfully by reaching the first ranking event semi-final of his 21-year professional career at the Wuxi Classic. His run included wins over local favourite Ding Junhui, Jamie Burnett and Graeme Dott to set up a last 4 clash with Stuart Bingham who had won the previous week's Asian PTC. He trailed 0–4 at the mid-session interval, before coming back to play inspired snooker to lead 5–4 in the best of 11 frames match. However, Bingham then levelled the contest before compiling a 134 break to win the decider and end Davis' hopes of a first ranking final. At the Six-red World Championship he claimed the title by defeating Shaun Murphy 8–4 in the final. The winner's cheque of £40,000 is the biggest of his career to date. In the Australian Goldfields Open Davis saw off Jack Lisowski (5–2), home favourite Neil Robertson (5–1) and Martin Gould (5–2), to reach his second successive ranking semi-final. There he played close friend Barry Hawkins and was beaten 4–6.

At the UK Championship he beat Cao Yupeng 6–1 in the first round and led three-time champion John Higgins 5–2 in the second round, before withstanding a fightback from Higgins which included a 147, to win a decider. Davis saw off Matthew Stevens 6–4 in the quarter-finals, however his lack of experience on the big stage showed in his semi-final against Mark Selby, as he was beaten 4–9.
Davis qualified for the 2013 Masters tournament thanks to his form earning him a place in the top 16. At his first outing in the tournament for 13 years he faced world number nine Mark Allen in the first round and lost 2–6. This began a dip in form for Davis as he lost in the qualifying round of the Welsh Open, the first round of both the World Open and Players Tour Championship Finals and in the second round of the China Open. However, he was still ranked 16 in the world at the cut-off for the 2013 World Championship, but was forced to qualify due to world number 28 and reigning champion Ronnie O'Sullivan deciding to defend his title after taking a year away from professional snooker. O'Sullivan was therefore the number one seed, meaning Davis dropped out of the top 16 who were guaranteed a spot in the event. Davis beat Liang Wenbo 10–6 in qualifying. He faced four-time champion John Higgins in the first round and claimed the best win of his career by winning 10–6 and played Stuart Bingham in the last 16. The match proved to be very tight, but from 10 to 10 Bingham pulled away to win 13–10 with Davis saying afterwards that he had done well to win 10 frames such was his disappointment at the way he had performed. However, he finished the season inside the top 16 for the very first time, at world number 13.

2013/2014 season
Davis reached the quarter-finals of the Australian Goldfields Open but lost 5–3 to Mark Selby.
At the 2013 Six-red World Championship he defended his title by defeating Neil Robertson 8–4 in the final. Only a week later he won his next tournament, the General Cup in Hong Kong, beating Robertson again in the final, this time by 7–2. A second ranking event quarter-final of the year came at the Shanghai Masters with comfortable 5–2 and 5–1 victories over Ali Carter and John Higgins. However, he then squandered a 4–2 lead over Xiao Guodong to be beaten 5–4. At the Masters he forced a decider in the first round against Mark Selby, having been 4–0 down but lost the 55-minute final frame to be defeated 6–5. In the quarter-finals of the German Masters, Davis lost in an extremely close match with Rod Lawler 5–4. Davis was an automatic qualifier for the World Championship for the first time in his career this season and said before the event that his minimum goal was to win through to the quarter-finals, but he was beaten 10–5 in the first round by Dominic Dale. Davis hung on to his top 16 ranking at the end of the season as he was the world number 16.

2014/2015 season

Davis began his season at the Australian Goldfields Open, with his quarter-final match against Stuart Bingham containing ten breaks above 50 in the nine frames played, which Davis edged 5–4. In Davis' fourth ranking event semi-final he lost 6–2 to home favourite Neil Robertson. His second quarter-final in a ranking event of the year came at the UK Championship, but he was defeated 6–1 by Judd Trump. He followed that up with a semi-final showing at the minor-ranking Lisbon Open where he was whitewashed 4–0 by Stephen Maguire. Davis was beaten 3–2 by Stuart Bingham in the final of the non-ranking Championship League.

Davis' consistent season continued as he restricted John Higgins to just 38 points to thrash him 4–0 in reaching the last eight of the Indian Open, but he lost 4–2 against Thepchaiya Un-Nooh. Davis progressed through to his fourth ranking quarter-final of the season, the most in a single season of his career, at the PTC Grand Final by eliminating Neil Robertson 4–1. He was unable to play in the semi-finals however, as Bingham knocked him out 4–1. Davis earned a 4–0 early advantage over Ding Junhui at the World Championship and won the first session 5–3. However, he went on to be beaten 10–7.

2015/2016 season
Davis' first quarter-final of the 2015–16 season came at the Shanghai Masters, courtesy of 5–1 and 5–3 wins over Michael White and Shaun Murphy, but he was beaten 5–1 by Mark Allen. He lost in the third round of the UK Championship 6–4 to Stephen Maguire. Davis claimed the World Seniors Championship, his first televised title in the UK, by seeing off Darren Morgan in the final. He failed to qualify for the World Championship for the first time since 2011 after losing 10–5 to Zhang Anda.

2016/2017 season

Davis lost 4–1 to Mark Selby in the quarter-finals of the Paul Hunter Classic. At the European Masters he beat Shaun Murphy 4–1 and Liang Wenbo 4–3 to reach another quarter-final and was defeated 4–1 by Ronnie O'Sullivan. His third quarter-final of the year came at the Scottish Open after he squeezed past Mark Williams 4–3, but he was heavily beaten 5–1 by Marco Fu. Davis knocked out Ronnie O'Sullivan 4–3 in the second round of the Welsh Open after being 3–0 down and then made the event's high break of 144 as he eliminated Fergal O'Brien 4–2. Davis lost 4–3 to Scott Donaldson in the fourth round. He could not reach the World Championship for the second year in a row after being defeated 10–7 in the qualifiers by Yan Bingtao.

Personal life 
Davis lives with his wife Claire, their son Jack and their daughter Milly.

Performance and rankings timeline

Career finals

Ranking finals: 1

Minor-ranking finals: 1

Non-ranking finals: 10 (8 titles)

Pro–am finals: 3 (1 title)

References

External links 

Mark Davis at worldsnooker.com

Sportspeople from Hastings
English snooker players
Living people
1972 births
World champions in snooker